Neal P. Nettesheim is a former Deputy Chief Judge and Presiding Judge of the Wisconsin Court of Appeals.

Career
Nettesheim received his bachelor's degree from Northwestern University and then began practicing law in 1966 following graduation from Marquette University Law School. His judicial career began in 1975 after he was elected a Waukesha County, Wisconsin Judge. Later, he became a Wisconsin Circuit Court Judge. He remained on the Circuit Court, eventually becoming a Presiding Judge, until his appointment to the Court of Appeals in 1984. During his tenure with the Court of Appeals, he served as a Presiding Judge twice. First, from 1990 to 1993, and second, from 2001 to 2003. He also became Deputy Chief Judge in 1998 and remained in that position until his retirement in 2007.

References

Wisconsin Court of Appeals judges
Wisconsin lawyers
Northwestern University alumni
Marquette University Law School alumni
Living people
Year of birth missing (living people)